The 2011 FA WSL was the inaugural season of the FA WSL, the top-level women's football league of England. The season began on 13 April 2011 and ended on 28 August 2011. The league also took a break between 12 May and mid-July to allow preparation for the 2011 FIFA Women's World Cup.

Arsenal won the competition, their eighth consecutive English title, Birmingham finished second. The second entry to the UEFA Women's Champions League was supposed to be given to the FA Women's Cup winner, on 6 December 2011 however it was announced that Birmingham as runners-up were given the spot.

Teams 

Sixteen clubs applied for a place in the inaugural season of the league: Arsenal, Barnet, Birmingham City, Bristol Academy, Chelsea, Colchester United, Doncaster Rovers Belles, Everton, Leeds Carnegie, Leicester City, Lincoln Ladies, Liverpool, Millwall Lionesses, Newcastle United, Nottingham Forest and Sunderland. Leeds Carnegie later withdrew their application.

Eight clubs were then picked by the FA from the remaining fifteen applicants: Arsenal, Birmingham City, Bristol Academy, Chelsea, Doncaster Rovers Belles, Everton, Lincoln Ladies, and Liverpool.

League table

Results

Top scorers

League Cup
The inaugural season of the League Cup, named the WSL Continental Cup, was played as a straight knock-out tournament. Arsenal won the Cup with a 4–1 victory over Birmingham. Arsenal also won the League and Women's FA Cup thus winning a treble that season.

References 

Women's Super League seasons
1
1